Eli Abaev (Hebrew: אלי אבייב; born December 13, 1998) is an American-Israeli basketball player for Maccabi Haifa of the Liga Leumit. He plays at the power forward and center positions.  He played college basketball for Eastern Florida State College, Austin Peay State University, and Florida Gulf Coast University.

Early life

Abaev was born in Israel and moved to the United States as a child. His hometown is Coral Springs, Florida, and he is Jewish. He is 6' 8" (203 cm) tall. He weighs 205 pounds (93 kg).

He played at Zion Lutheran High School in Deerfield Beach. There, Abaev averaged 12 points and 8  rebounds per game on 56% shooting from the floor for the Lions.

College
Abaev began his college career playing for Eastern Florida State College for two years. In 2016–17 in his first season, as the Titans were national runners-up, as a freshman he shot 59.8% from the floor, and had 7.4 rebounds per game. He was named to the 2017 National Junior College Athletic Association Division I Championship All-Tournament team.

In 2017–18 Abaev helped the Titans finish third in the NJCAA National Championship Tournament. He averaged 9.1 points and 9.8 rebounds (2nd in NJCAA Region 8) per game, shot 52.9% from the floor, and received First Team All-Mid-Florida Conference honors.

He transferred to Austin Peay State University, and in 2018–19 due to a lower-body injury he redshirted.

As a redshirt junior in 2019–20 he played for Austin Peay. In 2019–20 Abaev averaged 7.9 points and 7.7 rebounds (4th in the Ohio Valley Conference) per game for the Austin Peay Governors, shooting 50.6% from the field.

Abaev then transferred and attended Florida Gulf Coast University, graduating in 2021. In 2020–21 he played for the Florida Gulf Coast Eagles. He averaged 7.1 points, 7.4 rebounds (3rd in the Atlantic Sun Conference), and 0.7 blocks (4th) per game.

Professional career
Abaev started his professional career playing for Hapoel Be'er Sheva in the Israeli Basketball Premier League, with whom he signed on June 21, 2021.

International
Abaev played for Team USA in the 2019 European Maccabi Games, winning a gold medal and averaging 17.0 points and 15.3 rebounds in six games. In the gold medal game against Team Russia, he scored 23 points and had 28 rebounds.

See also
List of select Jewish basketball players

References 

1998 births
Living people
21st-century American Jews
American expatriate basketball people in Israel
American men's basketball players
Austin Peay Governors men's basketball players
Basketball players from Florida
Centers (basketball)
Eastern Florida State College people
Florida Gulf Coast Eagles men's basketball players
Hapoel Be'er Sheva B.C. players
Israeli American
Israeli men's basketball players
Jewish American sportspeople
Jewish men's basketball players
People from Deerfield Beach, Florida
Power forwards (basketball)
Sportspeople from Coral Springs, Florida